Kill Them with Kindness refers to:
 Kill Them with Kindness (The Jealous Sound album)
 Kill Them with Kindness (Headlights album)
"Kill 'Em with Kindness", song on Can't Get Enough, an Eddy Grant album
 "Kill Em with Kindness", a song by Selena Gomez